Bangers is a 1995 Philippine comedy film co-written and directed by Ben Feleo. The film stars Andrew E., Joey de Leon and Chiquito.

Cast
 Andrew E. as Hap Hibang
 Joey de Leon as Hep Hibang
 Arnel Ignacio as Hip Hibang
 Chiquito as Hop Hibang
 Ana Roces as Dorie
 Michael de Mesa as Richard
 Dindi Gallardo as Sharon
 Joji dela Paz as Mr. Lee

Production
The film had a working title Hibangers. When the writers found out that Sa Linggo nAPO Sila had an episode of the same title, it was shortened to Bangers to avoid confusion. This is the last film Andrew E. and Ana Roces paired up in until the 2020 film Pakboys Takusa and Roces' last film with Viva Films before her brief return to her home studio Regal Films.

References

External links

1995 films
1995 comedy films
Filipino-language films
Philippine comedy films
Viva Films films
Films directed by Ben Feleo